Statistics of the Primera División de México for the 1960–61 season.

Overview

Monterrey was promoted to Primera División.

The season was contested by 14 teams, and Guadalajara won the championship and becomes first team to win three consecutive championships.

Celaya was relegated to Segunda División.

Teams

League standings

Results

References
Mexico - List of final tables (RSSSF)

1960-61
Mex
1960–61 in Mexican football